A colour is a name for certain kinds of flags.

On land, it usually refers to regimental colours, but the term is also used outside military situations - for example, Boys Brigade as well as the Royal Rangers, Scout and Girl Guide flags are known as colours.
At sea, the term "flying the colours" refers to a warship sailing on the high seas and flying its national ensign, thereby making its presence (and therefore its nation's military influence) known to other naval powers.

See also
Colours, standards and guidons

Types of flags